Alexey Mikhailovich Shamrovsky better known as Leo Hao is a Russian fantasy artist. He is famous for painting cover art and illustrations for fantasy books and metal albums.

Works 
numerous cover arts and wallpapers for Aria
cover arts for Blind Guardian
cover arts for Iron Mask
cover arts for Iced Earth
cover art for Nocturnal Rites' album New World Messiah
cover arts for Yuri Nikitin's books
illustrations to Nick Perumov's novels
cover arts to Sergey Lukyanenko's books.
piece of art for Heroes V (First prize in official art contest)

External links 
Leo Hao's website
Leo Hao interview
Leo Hao's image for Heroes V

Russian speculative fiction artists
Fantasy artists
Science fiction artists
Living people
Year of birth missing (living people)